Rothenbach is an Ortsgemeinde – a community belonging to a Verbandsgemeinde – in the Westerwaldkreis in Rhineland-Palatinate, Germany.

Rotenbach may also refer to:
Rothenbach (Ems), a river of North Rhine-Westphalia, Germany, tributary of the Ems
Rothenbach (Werre), a river of North Rhine-Westphalia, Germany, tributary of the Werre
Rothenbach, a community of Kelberg, in Rhineland-Palatinate, Germany

People with the surname
Carsten Rothenbach (born 1980), German football defender

See also
Röthenbach (disambiguation)

German-language surnames